Inactive ubiquitin carboxyl-terminal hydrolase 53 is a protein that in humans is encoded by the USP53 gene.

Although USP53 is classified as a deubiquitinating enzyme based on sequence homology to other proteases from this group, it lacks a functionally essential histidine in the catalytic domaine and activity assays suggest that USP53 is catalytically inactive.
 Even though USP53 is devoid of catalytic activity, USP53 serves important physiological functions:
mutations in Usp53 have been shown to cause progressive hearing loss in mice, as well as late-onset hearing loss and cholestasis in humans.
USP53 localizes at cellular tight junctions and interacts with tight junction protein 2 (TJP2). Mutations in TJP2 have also been shown to cause hearing impairments and cholestasis.

References

Further reading